Ilan Averbuch (born 1953, Israel) is a sculptor living and working in Long Island City, New York. Averbuch creates large-scale monumental artworks and installations for gallery and museum exhibitions in addition to outdoor public spaces.

Biography 
Ilan Averbuch was born in Israel, in 1953. He then served in the Israeli Army, fighting in the Yom Kippur War. From 1976–1977 Averbuch traveled to North and South American living between the Cordilleras and the Amazon region, a formative trip that solidified his intention to become an artist. He moved to London in 1977 to attend the Wimbledon School of Art. In 1979 Averbuch moves to New York City to attend the School of Visual Arts to complete his B.F.A. He continues his art education at Hunter College in New York in and receives his M.F.A. in 1985.

Averbuch intermittently travels back to Israel in the mid 1980s to install his first official public project for the city of Tel Aviv. In 1985 he lived in Berlin on a grant from the German Academic Exchange Service (D.A.A.D). The artist returns to New York and exhibits Songs of Love and Hate at the Socrates Sculpture Park in 1988, an outdoor sculpture park overlooking the East River.

In the early 1990s, Averbuch started to more actively participate in public art competitions. In 1995, Averbuch travels to India to work in the foundries of Calcutta producing several large works in cast iron. Over the course of the next thirty years, the artist continues to travel, exhibit, and produce public art commissions internationally in New York, Germany, France, Switzerland, Canada, and India, among others. Today, he lives and works in Long Island City, New York.

Work 
Over his forty-year-long career, Averbuch has become one of the most successful public sculptors of the twenty-first century. His work appears across the globe in India, Israel, Poland, Germany, Switzerland, Canada, and throughout the United States. The monumental works are on an architectural scale and are designed to integrate with the environment rather than dominate it.His works are made from materials such as stone, wood, steel, copper, lead, glass and aluminum.  He uses stone repurposed from old roads and bridges. The materials exhibit the traces of their previous uses and applications to which the artist adds his own marks. Averbuch’s imagery and personal vocabulary draws from his life experiences and external cultural influences. Reoccurring symbols include organic forms and natural elements; figurative forms referencing the human body; manmade objects and architectural forms. The meanings are nuanced and open to interpretation. Among recurring themes in his work are civilization and its history, growth, transformation, the inevitable passage of time, dreams and memory, the relationship between text and image, and the conflict between our aspirations and our limitations. Averbuch’s imagination circles back on itself, recycling imagery and transforming reoccurring symbols creating endless paths of interpretation. A recent work, Tappan Zee (2020) depicts a row of seven abstract steel figures carrying a stone canoe. The sculpture pays tribute to the indigenous Native American Lenape tribe and their history along the Hudson River. Avanim Vetseadim (Steps and Stones) (2008) is located at Gezer Park in Leawood, Kansas. A stone ladder positioned within a pond, reaches toward the sky, creating a reflection in the water that stretches downward. The Dove Tower and Steps to the Bottom of a Pyramid (2002), occupies the central lawn at the University of Connecticut. The installation comprises a 21-foot high upside down tower composed of large flat stones. It stands over an inverted pyramid burrowing 10 feet below ground. The pyramid offers a quiet and contemplative space, while the precariously leaning tower is unsettling. Three works are installed at the Rose Garden Arena in Portland, Oregon. The Little Prince (1995) giant fallen copper crown depicts the ruin of an ancient majesty. Another work, Terra Incognita (1995), creates an enormous gateway made of wood and massive blocks of stone.Averbuch’s international public installations began in the mid-1980s with a commission for the City of Tel Aviv, Israel. Harp, the Sea, and the Quiet Wind (1989) portrays a stone, wood, and steel harp installed on the border between Jaffa and Tel Aviv at the Sir Charles Clore Park. In 1986, the artist is invited to Berlin to build a sculpture commemorating the city’s 750th anniversary. Wheat in Berlin evokes the silhouettes of figures marching down the railroad tracks, is made of recycled railroad tracks and discarded stones, remnants from the aftermath of the Second World War.  In the 1990s, Lutz Teutloff, a German philanthropist and art collector purchased Averbuch’s work and donated it to the Brock University in Ontario, Canada. (Macanuel, 2017). The university currently owns three pieces that are displayed throughout their campus. Averbuch returns to India in 1998 to build Calcutta Ladder, a 28-foot copper ladder, installed in the interior atrium of a corporation in Kolkata.
The Divided World, 2000 installed in Lavon, Israel overlooks the Beit Hakerem Valley. The work consists of two stone stairways, mirror images of each other but running in opposite directions and running in parallel. Between them extend two half arches, each one rising from a stairway and stretching toward the other. Two boulders hang from chains at the ends of the arches. The overall form of the work was inspired by the observatories at Jantar Mantar in India. The work speaks of broken dreams and continually lost possibilities installed amidst Galilee, Israel in an area of difficult and interminable conflicts of the modern world. In 2019, Averbuch creates a site-specific sculpture at Gut Holzhausen in Nieheim, Pömbsen, Germany. The work builds upon a preexisting stone house with a red-tiled roof. A wooden structure representing the skeleton of an old boat bursts from the house, in which the artist has created from wood culled from the surrounding forest.

Selected works
Songs of Love and Hate (1988), Queens, New York
Harp, the Sea, and the Quiet Wind (1989), Tel Aviv, Israel
Deus Ex Machina (1991), Open Museum, Tefen, Israel
Little Prince (1995), Portland, Oregon
 Terra Incognita (1995), Portland, Oregon
Divided World (2000), Lavon, Israel
Dove Tower and the Steps to the Bottom of a Pyramid (2004), Storrs, Connecticut
The Eye and the Horizon (2006), Stapleton, Colorado
South Tacoma (2008), Tacoma, Washington
Landmark (2008), Phoenix, Arizona
Under the Shadow of a Big Tree (2009), Tamarac, Florida
The Bell, The Flower, and the Wash (2009), Scottsdale, Arizona
Avanim Vetseadim (2009), Leawood, Kansas
Monument for Time (2010), Herriman, Utah
The House and the Boat (2012), Bellingham, Washington
Water (2013), El Paso, Texas
Theater of the Wind (2016), Tempe, Arizona
Mammoth (2018), Ellensburg, Washington
The House in the Boat the Boat in the House (2019), Nieheim, Germany
Tappan Zee (2020), South Nyack, New York
As Far As The Eyes Can See (2020), Lubbock, Texas
Ilan Ilan (2020), Ramat Gan, Israel

Exhibitions 
Averbuch’s work has been exhibited internationally with major solo exhibitions in the United States, Germany, Israel, France, Switzerland, the Netherlands, and Canada. In the 1980s Averbuch exhibits with OH Harris in New York, with solo exhibitions in 1981, 1983, 1985, and 1987. In 1986 he shows in Berlin Germany at the DAAD Gallery.

In 1997 Averbuch has a mid-career retrospective at The Open Museum in Tefen, Israel featuring seventeen sculptures and ten large drawings collected from Germany, the United States and Israel. Following Averbuch's 1997 exhibition the Open Museum Tefen purchases and keeps on display three sculptures Grapes and Other Promises, Deux ex Machina, and The River. Grapes and Other Promises (1994) depicts a cluster of grapes alluding to the story of the spies sent by Joshua to explore the Promised Land. This work, which over time has become one of the works most identified with the museum's sculpture garden, touches on the theme of unfulfilled biblical promises, while the ironic title chosen by Averbuch raises the question of whether Israel is indeed the Promised Land.

In 2005 the Katonah Museum of Art exhibits Averbuch's sculptures on the museum's front lawn and in the sculpture garden. In The End of Utopia (The Big Balloon is Far), situated in the front of the museum, is an assemblage of wood, glass, and stone. Wooden slats are arranged in a grid mirroring the shape of an aerial balloon, with a basket made of stone blocks that never made it off the ground. His drawings were on view in the Pryor Gallery until November 13, 2005. The drawings mark the process of creating sculptures, a place to work out ideas and to integrate the site-specific works into the environment they are to occupy.

An exhibition at the Open Museum in Omer from 2013–2015 brought together a selection of outdoor sculptures previously displayed in various sites around the globe. The exhibition combines large sculptural installation of six monumental outdoor sculptures with works that are on permanent display that have remained in the garden following Averbuch’s 1997 exhibition. In 2017 Nancy Hoffman Gallery in New York hosted the solo-exhibition “The Lily Pond,” an immersive installation, consisting of 14 sculptures displayed on large recycled granite millstones, dispersed through the gallery. The stones were raised off the ground, creating a field of seemingly floating round platforms reminding us of large lily pads on the surface of a pond.

Ilan Averbuch's work has been shown at the Arkansas Art Center, Little Rock; Art Gallery of Ontario, Toronto; Art in the Park, New York; Bronfman Centre, Montreal; The Brooklyn Museum, New York; Fort Tryon Park Project, New York; Het Apollohuis, The Netherlands; Hudson River Museum, Yonkers, New York; Hunter College, New York; Israel Museum, Jerusalem; The Jewish Museum, New York; Katonah Museum of Art, Katonah, New York; Kunstlerhaus Bethanien, Berlin; List Art Center, Brown University, Providence, Rhode Island; Poland Historical Museum, Lodz, Poland; MoMA P.S. 1, Long Island City, Queens, New York; Robert Moses Plaza, Fordham University at Lincoln Center, New York; Socrates Sculpture Park, Astoria, Queens, New York; Tefen Museum Sculpture Garden, Israel; Tel Aviv Museum, Israel; Tel Hai Art Center, Israel; Tel Noff Sculpture Garden, Israel.The artist's work is represented in numerous public collections, among them: Brock University, Ontario, Canada; Bronfman Centre, Montreal, Canada; Israel Museum, Jerusalem, Israel; Kunstlerhaus, Bethanien, Berlin, Germany; Prudential Insurance Company of America; Newark, New Jersey; Runnymede Sculpture Farm, Woodside, California; Tefen Museum, Israel; Tel Aviv Museum, Israel; Tel Hai Art Center, Israel; Tel Noff Sculpture Garden, Israel; and Texas Tech University, Lubbock, TX.

References

External links
 
 Ilan Averbuch: The Lily Pond, at Nancy Hoffman Gallery. [Video]
 Ilan Averbuch on Artnet
 Interview with Ilan Averbuch by William Garrett.
Video: Ilan Averbuch installing Mammoth, at Central Washington University, 2018.

1953 births
Living people
Israeli sculptors